Song Jae-ho (born Song Jae-eon; 10 March 1937 – 7 November 2020) was a South Korean actor.

Career
He made his acting debut in 1959, and became best known for his work in 1970s and 1980s Korean cinema, notably Yeong-ja's Heydays (1975). Song has since become one of the most respected veteran actors in Korean film and television, with more recent starring roles in the films Memories of Murder (2003), The President's Last Bang (2005) and Late Blossom (2011), as well as the television drama Precious Family (2004).

Filmography

Film

The Way (2017)
Northern Limit Line (2015) (cameo)
The Suspect (2013)
Marriage Blue (2013)
The Spy: Undercover Operation (2013)
The Tower (2012)
Sunday Punch (2011)
Quick (2011)
Late Blossom (2011)
Troubleshooter (2010)
Haeundae (2009)
Private Eye (2009)
A Tale of Legendary Libido (2008)
BA:BO (2008)
May 18 (2007)
Over the Border (2006) 
The President's Last Bang (2005)
Face (2004)
Sweet Sixties (2004) 
Too Beautiful to Lie (2004)
Silver Knife (2003) 
Singles (2003)
Memories of Murder (2003)
Double Agent (2003)
The Beauty in Dream (2002)
Musa (2001)
Ivan the Mercenary (1997)
Tip (1988)
The Chameleon's Poem (1988)
Love Song (1984)
The Winter That Year Was Warm (1984)
With Hope for Future Baseball King (1982)
Night of a Sorceress (1982)
Ardent Love (1982)
People of Kkobang Neighborhood (1982) 
The Glorious Days of Young-ja (Sequel) (1982)
Three Times Each for Short and Long Ways (1981)
The Hidden Hero (1980) 
The Terms of Love (1979) 
Arirang Ah! (1978)
Winter Woman (1977)
A Driver with a Nickname (1977) 
Season of Love (1977)
Girls From Scratch (1976)
Why Do You Ask My Past? (1976)
Kan-Nan (1976)
Counting Stars in a Night Sky (1976)
Young City (1976)
Cuckoo's Dolls (1976)
You Can Borrow My Love (1976)
Chang-su's Heydays (1975)
Wood and Swamp (1975)
Story of the Youth (1975)
Lee Jung-seob, a Painter (1975)
Yeong-ja's Heydays (1975)
25 O'clock of Youth (1973)
Wedding Dress in Tears (1973)
Looking for Sons and Daughters (1972)
Cruel History of Myeongdong (1972)
The Golden Harbor in Horror (1971)
King Sejo the Great (1970)
The Lost Wedding Veil (1970)
Love and Death (1970)
Evil Person (1969)
The Starting Point (1967)
A Spotted Man (1967)
Legend of Ssarigol (1967)
Heukmaek (1965)
The Bacheolor Pub (1964)

Television drama

Local Hero (OCN, 2016)
Missing You (MBC, 2012)
The Chaser (SBS, 2012)
Can't Lose (MBC, 2011) (guest appearance, ep 1-4)
Miss Ripley (MBC, 2011)
Sign (SBS, 2011)
I Believe in Love (KBS2, 2011) 
Thank You for Your Smile (KBS2, 2010)
The Fugitive: Plan B (KBS2, 2010)
Hot Blood (KBS2, 2009)
Partner (KBS2, 2009)
My Husband's Woman (SBS, 2007)
Que Sera, Sera (MBC, 2007)
Crazy for You (SBS, 2007)
The Invisible Man (KBS2, 2006)
Which Star Are You From? (MBC, 2006)
Love Is Over (MBC, 2006)
Shin Don (MBC, 2005)
Precious Family (KBS2, 2004) 
Freezing Point (MBC, 2004)
Sweet Buns (MBC, 2004)
My Hidden Love (MBC, 2004)
War of the Roses (MBC, 2004)
Sunlight Pours Down (SBS, 2004)
Breathless (MBC, 2003) 
The Fairy and the Swindler (SBS, 2003)
While You Were Dreaming (MBC, 2003)
Jang Hee-bin (KBS2, 2002)
Since We Met (MBC, 2002)
Whenever the Heart Beats (KBS2, 2002)
Mom's Song (SBS, 2002)
Present (MBC, 2002)
Sangdo (MBC, 2002)
Piano (SBS, 2001)
Empress Myeongseong (KBS2, 2001)
Tender Hearts (KBS1, 2001)
Pardon (SBS, 2000)
Air Force (MBC, 2000)
Wrath of an Angel (SBS, 2000)
Medical Center (SBS, 2000)
The Full Sun (KBS2, 2000)
Youth (MBC, 1999) 
Invitation (KBS2, 1999)
Roses and Bean Sprouts (MBC, 1999)
KAIST (SBS, 1999)
The King and the Queen (KBS1, 1998)
Seoul Tango (SBS, 1998)
To the End of the World (MBC, 1998) 
The Mountain (MBC, 1997)
Beautiful My Lady (SBS, 1997)
The Most Beautiful Goodbye in the World (MBC, 1996)
Tears of the Dragon (KBS1, 1996)
Their Embrace (MBC, 1996)
Project (KBS2, 1996)
Thaw (SBS, 1995)
Asphalt Man (SBS, 1995)
Kka Chi (SBS, 1994)
Tomorrow Love (KBS2, 1993)
Autumn Woman (SBS, 1992)
92 Whale Hunting (KBS2, 1992)
And Shaky Times (KBS2, 1991)
둥지를 찾아서 (KBS1, 1991)
What the Women Live (MBC, 1990)
Punggaek (KBS2, 1988)
The Tree of Love (KBS2, 1987)
Southern Cross (KBS1, 1986)
Family (KBS2, 1984)
TV Tale of Chunhyang (KBS2, 1984)
갈매기 처녀 (KBS1, 1983)
Foundation of the Kingdom (KBS1, 1983)
Ordinary People (KBS1, 1982)
The New Bride (KBS)
Eye (KBS2, 1981)
벼랑위의 사람들 (KBS, 1980)
Comrades (KBS, 1975)
113 수사본부 (MBC, 1973)

Awards
1982 18th Baeksang Arts Awards: Best TV Actor (The New Bride)

State honors

Notes

References

External links

South Korean male film actors
South Korean male television actors
1937 births
2020 deaths
20th-century South Korean male actors
21st-century South Korean male actors
People from Pyongyang
Dong-a University alumni